Saint Michel United Football Club are a Seychelles based football club from Roche Caiman and founded in 1996.  They play in the Seychelles First Division. The club have been crowned champions of Seychelles on thirteen occasions.

Achievements
Seychelles League: 13
 1996, 1997, 1999, 2000, 2002 (shared), 2003, 2007, 2008, 2010, 2011, 2012, 2014, 2015.

Seychelles FA Cup: 11
 1997, 1998, 2001, 2006, 2007, 2008, 2009, 2011, 2013, 2014, 2016.

Seychelles League Cup: 5
 2004, 2008, 2009, 2010, 2011.

Seychelles Presidents Cup: 11
 1996, 1997, 1998, 2000, 2001, 2006, 2007, 2009, 2010, 2011.2017

Performance in CAF competitions

CAF Champions League: 9 appearances
1997 – Preliminary Round
1998 – Preliminary Round
2000 – First Round
2001 – Second Round
2004 – First Round
2008 – Preliminary Round
2011 – Preliminary Round
2013 – Preliminary Round
2015 – Preliminary Round 
2016 – Preliminary Round 

CAF Confederation Cup: 
2017 – Preliminary Round

Current players

References

External links
Team profile – The Biggest Football Archive of the World
Team profile – soccerway.com

Football clubs in Seychelles

1996 establishments in Seychelles
Association football clubs established in 1996